Burathema is a genus of moths of the family Crambidae. It contains only one species, Burathema divisa, which is found on Borneo.

References

Pyraustinae
Crambidae genera
Taxa named by Francis Walker (entomologist)